Planovalgus deformity is a postural deformity, flat foot typology,  very frequent in people with cerebral palsy and often due to muscle imbalance resulting in a predominance of the pronotory versus the supinatory forces.


Treatment
Surgical treatment in the presence of planovalgus deformity can be of two types:

Grice-Viladot technique, which is performed if the patient is over 8 years old.
Dual arthrodesis technique, which is performed if the patient is over 12 years old.

Both techniques provide for a thirty-day subsequent protection with a plastered knee-high without load.

Bibliography
 P.F. Costici, R. Russo: Il piede piatto neurogeno in Il piede piatto infantile 
 P.F. Costici, R. Russo, O. Palmacci: surgical techniques for pes planovalgus deformity in cerebral palsy  in Journal of Orthopaedics and Traumatology

References

Orthopedic problems